Ashwani Kumar Sharma is an Indian politician and member of the Bharatiya Janata Party. Sharma is a member of the Jammu and Kashmir Legislative Assembly from the Bishnah constituency in Jammu district as Independent candidates.

References 

People from Jammu
Bharatiya Janata Party politicians from Jammu and Kashmir
Living people
21st-century Indian politicians
Politicians from Jammu
Year of birth missing (living people)
Jammu and Kashmir MLAs 2002–2008
Jammu and Kashmir MLAs 2008–2014